The Eurovision Song Contest 2015 was the 60th edition of the Eurovision Song Contest. Organised by the European Broadcasting Union (EBU) and host broadcaster Österreichischer Rundfunk (ORF), the contest was held at the Hall D of the Wiener Stadthalle and consisted of two semi-finals on 19 and 21 May, and a final on 23 May 2015. The three live shows were presented by Austrian television presenters Mirjam Weichselbraun, Alice Tumler and Arabella Kiesbauer, while the previous edition's winner Conchita Wurst acted as the green room host.

Forty countries participated in the contest, with  making a guest appearance.
Meanwhile,  announced their non-participation due to financial and political crises related to the Russo-Ukrainian War.

This was the country's second win in just three years, having also won the 2012 edition. It also marked the shortest gap between two wins for the same country since Ireland's  and  victories. Russia, Italy, Belgium and Australia rounded out the top five. This was the first time since the juries were reintroduced alongside the televoting in  that the winner did not place first in the televoting; Italy was the televote winner, while Sweden was the jury winner. Further down the table, Montenegro achieved its best result since its independence, finishing thirteenth.

For the first time, the top four of the contest all scored 200 points or better. Russia's entry "A Million Voices" became the first non-winning Eurovision song to score over 300 points.  and  became the first countries since  to score no points in the final, with Austria also becoming the first host country to score no points.

The EBU reported that over 197 million viewers worldwide watched the contest, beating the 2014 viewing figures by 2 million.

Location

Venue 

The event took place in Vienna, Austria, with the venue being the Wiener Stadthalle (specifically the main hall - Hall D) after Austria won the right to host this edition of the Eurovision Song Contest after winning the 2014 edition with the song "Rise Like a Phoenix", performed by Conchita Wurst. The Wiener Stadthalle hosts the annual Erste Bank Open tennis tournament, along with many concerts and events throughout the year. The main hall (Hall D) has a capacity of approximately 16,000 attendees.

Bidding phase 
After Austria's victory in the  contest, their delegation revealed the possibility of hosting the contest either in the capital city, Vienna, or in Salzburg. Vienna, Klagenfurt, Innsbruck, Lower Austria, Graz, Upper Austria, Burgenland, and Vorarlberg were all reportedly interested in hosting the contest; Salzburg pulled out of the bidding phase as the city was not able to meet the cost of the venue and promotion.

Vienna, considered the front-runner, had two venues in the phase: Wiener Stadthalle and the trade fair centre, Messe Wien, with capacities of up to 16,000 and 30,000 attendees respectively. Also in the race were Stadthalle Graz and Schwarzl Freizeit Zentrum, both located in the second largest city of Austria, Graz. With a maximum capacity of 30,000, the Wörthersee Stadium in Klagenfurt also joined the race; however, it would require the construction of a roof for the contest to be hosted there. Innsbruck also joined the race with Olympiahalle, which hosted ice hockey and figure skating at the 1964 and 1976 Winter Olympics. A fifth city, Linz, joined the race with Brucknerhaus, although the venue would not be big enough for the contest. Being geographically close to Linz, Wels showed desire to host the event as well. Oberwart, with the Exhibition hall, and Vorarlberg, with the Vorarlberger Landestheater, were the latest cities to declare an interest.

On 29 May 2014, Austrian host public broadcaster ORF and the EBU released some requirements and details about the venue. ORF requested interested parties to respond by 13 June 2014. 
 The venue must be available for at least 6 to 7 weeks before the contest and one week after the conclusion of the contest.
 The Green Room should be located in the arena or as near it as possible, with a capacity of 300. 
 An additional room at least  in area, to house 2 catering stands, a viewing room, make-up rooms, wardrobe, and booths for approximately 50 commentators. 
 Separate offices to house the press centre, open between 11 and 24 May 2015, at least  in area, with a capacity of at least 1,500 journalists.

After the deadline on 13 June 2014, ORF announced 12 venues interested in hosting the 2015 Eurovision Song Contest: ORF announced on 21 June 2014 that 3 cities (Vienna, Innsbruck, and Graz) had been short-listed in the final stage of the bidding process. On 6 August 2014, ORF announced the Wiener Stadthalle in Vienna as the host venue. The contest was provisionally set to take place on 12, 14 and 16 May 2015, but the dates were later pushed back a week in order to accommodate the candidate cities.

Key

 Host venue
 Shortlisted

Inclusive traffic lights in Vienna 
The city of Vienna introduced temporary new traffic signals for pedestrians on some streets, featuring same-sex couples holding hands or hugging. They were introduced as part of events connected to the theme of tolerance and inclusion in the lead-up to the Eurovision Song Contest.

Traffic lights of the same – copyrighted – design of the kind "Ampelpärchen" (couples for traffic lights) followed before Christopher Street Days in June 2015 in Salzburg and Linz. In Salzburg the initiative SoHo and social democrate mayor Schaden promoted the change of the shape of the LED-lamps. The faceplates in Linz has been financed by sponsors driven by a Facebook-based initiative, but have been removed – without consent – by the new traffic minister of Linz of the party FPÖ in early December 2015.

Format 
The competition consisted of two semi-finals and a final, a format which has been in use since . The ten countries with the highest scores in each semi-final qualified to the final where they joined the host nation Austria, the five main sponsoring nations (known as the "Big Five"): France, Germany, Italy, Spain and the United Kingdom, and Australia which was invited this year to commemorate the contest's 60th anniversary. Each participating country had their own national jury, which consisted of five professional members of the music industry. Each member of a respective nation's jury was required to rank every song, except that of their own country. The voting results from each member of a particular nation's jury were combined to produce an overall ranking from first to last place. Likewise, the televoting results were also interpreted as a full ranking, taking into account the full televoting result rather than just the top ten. The combination of the juries' full ranking and the televote's full ranking produced an overall ranking of all competing entries. The song which scored the highest overall rank received 12 points, while the tenth-best ranked song received one point. In the event of a televoting failure (insufficient number of votes or technical issues) or jury failure (technical issue or breach of rules), only one of the methods was used by each country.

Organising team formation 
During an initial meeting between the host broadcaster ORF and the EBU in late May 2014, the representatives of the core organising team were selected. Edgar Böhm, who is the Head of Entertainment at ORF, was announced as the executive producer.

Graphic design 

On 31 July 2014, the EBU released a new and revamped version of the generic logo as a celebration of the Eurovision Song Contest's 60th anniversary. On 11 September, the slogan for the 2015 contest was revealed to be "Building Bridges". The graphic design of the contest was revealed by the EBU on 25 November. The theme art depicts a wave made up of spheres which symbolise diversity, the bridging of connections and people's experiences.

The postcards of this year's contest was also based on the slogan "Building Bridges". Each postcard starts with a drive-by scene of the contestants' capital city, before showing every contestant receiving an invitation to Austria, where the contestants take part in a local activity. The postcards end with a picture of their activity plastered onto a billboard, placed in different locations across Vienna.

For this year's contest, all hashtags for the participating countries incorporated IOC country codes which were displayed onscreen alongside the main country names.

Presenters 
Mirjam Weichselbraun, Alice Tumler and Arabella Kiesbauer were the hosts of the 2015 contest; the all-female trio was the first in history to host the contest. The previous edition's winner Conchita Wurst was chosen as green room host.

Semi-final allocation draw 
The draw that determined the semi-final allocation was held on 26 January 2015 at the Vienna Rathaus and hosted by Andi Knoll and Kati Bellowitsch. The participating countries, excluding the automatic finalists (host country Austria, the "Big Five" and Australia), were split into five pots, based on voting patterns from the previous ten years. The pots were calculated by the televoting partner Digame and were as follows:

Opening and interval acts
The EBU ident's accompanying "Te Deum", which opened the broadcasts, was performed by the Vienna Philharmonic orchestra from the gardens of Schönbrunn Palace for the final. The overture featured violinist Lidia Baich, winner of the Eurovision Young Musicians 1998, who performed live on stage an excerpt of Austria's  winning song "Merci, Chérie" in tribute to Udo Jürgens. The ESC Vienna All-Stars, consisting of Conchita Wurst, the Vienna Boys' Choir, multinational Suparar Children's Choir, rapper Left Boy, and the contest's presenters, then jointly performed the official anthem of the contest, "Building Bridges", accompanied by the ORF Radio Symphony Orchestra under the direction of Peter Pejtsik. The twenty-seven finalists later took to the stage during the flag parade via a walkway through the audience from the green room.

The interval act was provided by percussionist Martin Grubinger and his band, the Percussive Planet Ensemble. The nine-minute performance, based on classical themes of major Austrian composers, included forty instrumentalists as well as the Grammy Award-winning Arnold Schoenberg Choir. Wurst later performed "You Are Unstoppable" and "Firestorm", both from her self-titled debut album.

Participating countries 

On 23 December 2014, thirty-nine countries were initially announced to be participating in the 2015 contest.  and  returned after one-year absences, the  returned after a five-year absence, while  did not enter. Australia was later announced to be making its debut as a guest participant. The deadline to apply for participation was 15 September 2014. Countries that applied had until 10 October 2014 to withdraw from participation without financial consequences.

Invitation of Australia 
On 10 February 2015, the EBU announced that in honour of the 60th anniversary of Eurovision, it had invited  to participate in the final of the contest, represented by Special Broadcasting Service (SBS). SBS had been a long-time broadcaster of the event, which has had a large following in Australia. The Australian entry was placed directly in the grand final. Although it was considered a one-off event, if Australia were to win, SBS would have co-hosted the 2016 contest in a European host city of its choice. The EBU considered the possibility of similarly inviting countries to participate in future editions of the contest. Australia's participation brought the number of the finalists up to 27, the highest number of entries in a final in the contest's history.

Returning artists 
Amber, who represented , was a backing vocalist for the Maltese entry in 2012. Uzari, who represented , was a backing vocalist for the Belarusian entry in 2011. Elnur Hüseynov, who was 's debut representative at the Eurovision Song Contest 2008, as part of the duo Elnur and Samir, was internally selected to represent the nation for a second time. Nicolas Dorian, part of Witloof Bay, Belgium representatives in 2011, was part of the backing vocalists of Loic Nottet.

Semi-final 1 
16 countries took part in the first semi-final. The highlighted countries qualified for the final.

Semi-final 2 
17 countries took part in this semi-final. The highlighted countries qualified for the final.

Final 
As in the 2014 contest, the winner was announced as soon as it was mathematically impossible to catch up. In this case, the winner had been determined by the 36th vote, which came from Cyprus. 27 countries participated in the final, which is the most in any contest ever.

Detailed voting results

Semi-final 1

12 points 
Below is a summary of the maximum 12 points each country awarded to another in the first semi-final. Countries which gave the maximum 12 points apiece from both the professional jury and televoting to the specified entrant are marked in bold.

Semi-final 2

12 points 
Below is a summary of the maximum 12 points each country awarded to another in the second semi-final. Countries which gave the maximum 12 points apiece from both the professional jury and televoting to the specified entrant are marked in bold.

Final 
This is the first time since the juries were reintroduced alongside the televoting in  that the winner was not placed first in the televoting.

12 points 
Below is a summary of the maximum 12 points each country awarded to another in the final. Countries which gave the maximum 12 points apiece from both the professional jury and televoting to the specified entrant are marked in bold.

Spokespersons 
The voting order was revealed the morning of the final, and for the only time in Eurovision history to date, the names of all the spokespersons were displayed onscreen. However, because of technical problems in some countries the final voting order was the following:

 Andrea Demirović
 Julie Zahra
 Krista Siegfrids
 Helena Paparizou
 Sonia Argint-Ionescu
 Teo
 Andri Xhahu
 Olivia Furtună
 Tural Asadov
 Markus Riva
 
 Basim
 Laetitia Guarino
 Walid
 Virginie Guilhaume
 Lilit Muradyan
 Nicky Byrne
 Mariette Hansson
 Barbara Schöneberger
 Lee Lin Chin
 
 
 Kati Bellowitsch
 Marko Mark
 Tinkara Kovač 
 Csilla Tatár
 Nigella Lawson
 Ugnė Galadauskaitė
 Edsilia Rombley 
 
 
  
 Valentina Monetta 
 Federico Russo
 Sigríður Halldórsdóttir
 Loukas Hamatsos
 Margrethe Røed
 Suzy 
 Tanja 
 Natia Bunturi

Other countries 

Eligibility for potential participation in the Eurovision Song Contest requires a national broadcaster with active EBU membership that would be able to broadcast the contest via the Eurovision network. The EBU issued an invitation to participate in the contest to all active members.

Active EBU members 
  – On 17 June 2014, Andorran broadcaster Ràdio i Televisió d'Andorra (RTVA) confirmed that Andorra would not return to the contest in 2015.
  – The Bosnian broadcaster, Radio and Television of Bosnia and Herzegovina (BHRT), had submitted a provisional application to participate in the 2015 contest, whilst they determined how to fund the participation fees. This application was subject to change and participation could subsequently be withdrawn. On 17 November 2014, the broadcaster announced that they had withdrawn their application to participate at the forthcoming contest because of financial reasons.
  – Despite sending a preliminary application to participate, on 10 October 2014 the Bulgarian broadcaster Bulgarian National Television (BNT) announced that it would not return to the contest because of financial reasons. On 31 October 2014, BNT confirmed that they had not yet taken a final decision on participation at the 2015 contest, and that the EBU had given them extra time to resolve outstanding budget issues. However, on 18 December 2014, BNT confirmed via their official Eurovision Twitter account that they would not take part in the 2015 contest.
  – On 26 September 2014, Croatian national broadcaster Croatian Radiotelevision (HRT) confirmed that Croatia would not participate in the 2015 contest.
  – Télé Liban (TL) confirmed on 15 September 2014 that Lebanon would not be making their debut in Vienna. Lebanon were initially going to make their debut at the 2005 contest, but they pulled out prior to the contest due to financial reasons.
  – On 31 July 2014, RTL Télé Lëtzebuerg confirmed that Luxembourg would not be returning to the contest in 2015. However, it was reported on 26 October 2014 that the country's Minister of Culture, Maggy Nagel, expressed her desire for the country to return to the contest. This was later confirmed by Nagel to be a "misunderstanding" and that the country would not be returning. A collaboration with San Marino had been proposed by the broadcaster SMRTV and singer Thierry Mersch, but later SMRTV clarified that there have only been talks between the two countries and the broadcaster is evaluating other proposals. However, on 24 November 2014, it was announced that Mersch had failed to raise the necessary funds in time for the project to move forward.
  – Monegasque broadcaster Télé Monte Carlo (TMC) confirmed on 20 June 2014 that Monaco would not return to the contest in 2015.
  – Moroccan broadcaster Société Nationale de Radiodiffusion et de Télévision (SNRT) confirmed on 31 October 2014 that Morocco would not return to the contest in 2015.
  – On 26 August 2014, Radio and Television Slovakia (RTVS) announced that Slovakia would not return to the contest in 2015 because of financial restrictions and an incompatibility between the contest format and the programming goals of the broadcaster.
In late August 2014, it was reported that international public relations officer for TRT, Yağmur Tüzün, stated that Turkey would not be returning to the contest in 2015 and that TRT currently has no plans to return to the competition. The non-participation was further confirmed on 5 September 2014. 
  – On 19 September 2014, Ukrainian broadcaster National Television Company of Ukraine (NTU) announced that Ukraine would not be participating in the contest because of financial reasons and the ongoing armed conflict in the country. On 16 September 2015, it was announced that Ukraine would return to the contest in 2016.

Non-EBU member 
  – The Liechtenstein broadcaster 1FLTV suspended its plans to join the EBU because of lack of funding.

Broadcasts 

Most countries sent commentators to Vienna or commentated from their own country, in order to add insight to the participants and, if necessary, the provision of voting information.

It was reported by the EBU that the 2015 contest was viewed by a worldwide television audience of a record breaking 197 million viewers, beating the 2014 record which was viewed by 195 million.

Incidents

Reaction to Russia's results

During the results segment of the final, loud boos could be heard whenever Russia was mentioned or the country received one of the top three set of points (12, 10 or 8 points). The Russian entrant Polina Gagarina could be seen crying in the green room during the voting procedure, and this was reported by various media to have occurred as a result of the booing. During a break in the countries' reporting of their votes, when the running total showed Russia leading, green room host Conchita Wurst said to Gagarina, "You gave an amazing performance, and you deserve to be in the lead." The contest's executive supervisor, Jon Ola Sand, urged that Eurovision should be a "friendly battlefield....not a political battleground", and presenter Alice Tumler reminded the audience that "Our motto is 'Building Bridges', and music should stand over politics tonight." The organisers had anticipated such reactions, and had prepared and installed 'anti-booing technology', which was deployed for the first time in the history of the contest.

Smoke machine malfunction
During the performance of Georgia in the grand final, a smoke machine malfunctioned, causing the Georgian entrant Nina Sublatti to temporarily disappear from view on the stage in a cloud of grey smoke.

Macedonia and Montenegro jury results excluded
The jury votes from Macedonia and Montenegro in the final were not included, in accordance with the rules of the contest. The rules indicate that votes must consist of 50% jurors and 50% televoting, but Macedonia's and Montenegro's votes was based entirely on televoting. The final result of the contest was not affected.

Other awards 
In addition to the main winner's trophy, the Marcel Bezençon Awards and the Barbara Dex Award were contested during the 2015 Eurovision Song Contest. The OGAE, "General Organisation of Eurovision Fans" voting poll also took place before the contest.

Marcel Bezençon Awards 
The Marcel Bezençon Awards, organised since 2002 by Sweden's then-Head of Delegation and 1992 representative Christer Björkman, and 1984 winner Richard Herrey, honours songs in the contest's final. The awards are divided into three categories: Artistic Award, Composers Award, and Press Award. The winners were revealed shortly before the final on 23 May.

OGAE 
OGAE, an organisation of over forty Eurovision Song Contest fan clubs across Europe and beyond, conducts an annual voting poll first held in 2002 as the Marcel Bezençon Fan Award. The 2015 poll ran from 1 to 10 May, and after all votes were cast, the top-ranked entry was Italy's "" performed by Il Volo; the top five results are shown below.

Barbara Dex Award 
The Barbara Dex Award is a humorous fan award given to the worst dressed artist each year. Named after Belgium's representative who came last in the 1993 contest, wearing her self-designed dress, the award was handed by the fansite House of Eurovision from 1997 to 2016 and is being carried out by the fansite songfestival.be since 2017.

Official album 

Eurovision Song Contest: Vienna 2015 is the official compilation album of the 2015 contest, put together by the European Broadcasting Union and was released by Universal Music Group on 20 April 2015. The album features all 40 songs that entered in the 2015 contest, including the semi-finalists that failed to qualify into the grand final.

Charts and certifications

Notes

References

External links 

60 Years of Eurovision

 
2015
Music festivals in Austria
2015 in Austria
2015 song contests
2010s in Vienna
Music in Vienna
May 2015 events in Europe
Events in Vienna